Vicente Guerrero is a town and seat of the municipality of Guerrero, in the northern Mexican state of Chihuahua. As of 2010, the town had a population of 7,751, up from 6,536 as of 2005. 

It was the location of the March 1916 Battle of Guerrero.

References

Populated places in Chihuahua (state)